Pierre Scribante (21 March 1931 – 13 November 2013) was a French professional racing cyclist. He rode in the 1956 Tour de France.

References

External links
 

1931 births
2013 deaths
French male cyclists
Cyclists from Lyon